Jacob Schopf (born 8 June 1999) is a German sprint canoeist.

Bio 

Schopf grew up in Mahlsdorf, a part of the Berlin Marzahn-Hellersdorf district. He has a sister who is three years older than him. 
In 2018, he graduated from the Flatow Oberschule in Berlin-Köpenick. In same year, he joined Bundeswehr as a sport soldier. Here he currently has the rank of non-commissioned officer.
In the end of 2018, he began studying sports and geography at the Humboldt University in Berlin. In 2020, he moved to Potsdam and continued studying in the University of Potsdam.

Sport career 
At the age of eight, Jacob Schopf has interested himself in canoe racing, which led him to the Köpenicker Canoe Club (KKC Berlin) in 2007.

His first coach was Philip Krack, who still supports him today. Schopf took part in his first international competition 2015, being qualified as a part of the junior national team at the Junior World Championship in Montemor-o-Velho. Showing his extraordinary talent, he finished in the fourth place at his very first kayak competition.

Schopf achieved his first junior world title a year later, in 2016 Minsk, where he won gold in the kayak single. The following year he defended this title at the Junior World Championships in Piteşti and extended his list of success with another gold in the men's kayak four. After two more years in the junior national team, Schopf qualified directly for the senior team in 2018, skipping the U23 national team.
In January 2020, Schopf moved from Berlin to Potsdam where he joined Kanu Club Potsdam. The reasons for the change were the retirement of his coach Eckehardt Sahr and the stronger training group in Potsdam.

At the seniors World Championships in Montemor-o-Velho, 19-year-old Jacob Schopf achieved his first major international success with the men's kayak four. In the following year he also impressed with strong performances and has formed a two-man kayak team with Max Hoff. The so-called generation boat celebrated its first World Championships title at the 2019 World Cup in Szeged. That victory at the World Championships has led Schopf to the nomination for the 2020 Summer Olympics in Tokyo where he will compete in a single kayak and together in a double kayak with Max Hoff.

References

External links 
 
 Jacob Schopf at Deutscher Kanu-Verband (German Canoe Federation)
 

1999 births
Living people
German male canoeists
ICF Canoe Sprint World Championships medalists in kayak
European Games medalists in canoeing
European Games gold medalists for Germany
Olympic canoeists of Germany
Canoeists at the 2019 European Games
Canoeists at the 2020 Summer Olympics
Medalists at the 2020 Summer Olympics
Olympic silver medalists for Germany
Olympic medalists in canoeing